Ivana Kořinková (born 20 October 1950) is a Czech basketball player. She competed in the women's tournament at the 1976 Summer Olympics.

References

1950 births
Living people
Czech women's basketball players
Olympic basketball players of Czechoslovakia
Basketball players at the 1976 Summer Olympics
Sportspeople from Prague